Sian-e Olya (also Romanized as Sīān-e ‘Olyā, Sīān ‘Olyā, Sīyān Olyā, and Seyān ‘Olyā; also known as Sīān Bāla and Sīān-e Bālā) is a village in Hamzehlu Rural District, in the Central District of Khomeyn County, Markazi Province, Iran. At the 2006 census, its population was 283, in 98 families.

References 

Populated places in Khomeyn County